Shahan may refer to:

Places
Shahan, West Virginia, an unincorporated community in Upshur County
Shahan District, in Yemen

People
Robert R. Shahan (born 1939), American bishop
Shahan Natalie (1884–1983), Armenian politician and activist
Shahan Shahnour (1903-1974), French-Armenian writer and poet
Shirley Shahan, American drag racer
Thomas Joseph Shahan (1857–1932), American Roman Catholic theologian and educator
Shahan Ali Mohsin, Indian race driver

See also
Chahan (disambiguation)